Myctophum selenops, the Wisner's lanternfish, is a species of lanternfish.

References

External links

Myctophidae
Taxa named by Åge Vedel Tåning
Fish described in 1928